This is a list of the commemorative stamps of the United Kingdom for the years 2000–2009.

List

Other decades
 United Kingdom commemorative stamps 1924–1969
 United Kingdom commemorative stamps 1970–1979
 United Kingdom commemorative stamps 1980–1989
 United Kingdom commemorative stamps 1990–1999
 United Kingdom commemorative stamps 2010–2019
 United Kingdom commemorative stamps 2020–2029

Acknowledgements 
 Stanley Gibbons
 Concise Stamp Catalogue
 Gibbons Stamp Monthly
 Royal Mail Stamp Guide
 Royal Mail British Philatelic Bulletin

See also

 Stanley Gibbons
 Stamp Collecting
 List of people on stamps
 Philately
 Stamps
 PHQ Cards

References

External links
 Stanley Gibbons Stamps Shop Homepage
 Royal Mail
 Collect GB Stamps

2000
Commemorative stamps
Lists of postage stamps
Commemorative
Commemorative stamps